Chris Walter (born August 16, 1959) is a Canadian punk rock historian, novelist and founder of the independent publishing company GFY Press. His novels generally portray the darker aspects of humanity such as drug addiction, prostitution, and homelessness.

Biography
Born in Regina, Saskatchewan, Chris was raised in Winnipeg, Manitoba. He became involved with drugs at a very early age and was kicked out of school before leaving home at fifteen, working a succession of menial jobs and collecting welfare for long stretches. Forming his first punk rock band in 1980, Chris soon realized that he was never going to be a musician and began publishing a punk fanzine, Pages of Rage, which gave him his first taste of creative writing, although he wouldn't complete his first novel, Beer, until he was almost forty. His drug addiction raged out of control after moving to Vancouver, British Columbia in 1991, where he completed several novels but overdosed on heroin and eventually became homeless. Upon rehabilitation in January 2001, he devoted himself to work and to his family. Chris Walter resides in New Westminster BC with his long-time girlfriend and their son.

GFY Press
Specializing in books concerning punks, drunks, junkies and prostitutes. GFY Press has published dozens of titles: more than twelve novels by Walter, his autobiographical trilogy, two collections of short stories, novels authored by Simon Snotface, Drew Gates, and Stewart Black, and biographies of Canadian punk groups  Personality Crisis, SNFU, the Real McKenzies, Randy Rampage, and the Dayglo Abortions. Despite their dark subject matter, Walter's books are known for black humour, presented in prose described by critics as "convincing, lively, real, accessible, and wildly entertaining."

Other contributions
Walter has also contributed to a number of publications, including The Nerve, Mass Movement, Razorcake, The Big Takeover, The Georgia Straight, Vice, Loud Fast Rules, The Republic, and Absolute Underground. He was featured in Prairie Coast Films' 2010 documentary Open Your Mouth And Say... Mr. Chi Pig, a film that looks at the life of SNFU singer Mr. Chi Pig.

Bibliography
Literary Memoirs
Mosquitoes & Whisky (2001)
I Was a Punk Before You Were a Punk (2003)
I'm On the Guest List (2005)

Novels
Beer (1999)
Anarchy Soup (2001)
Kaboom (2002)
Punk Rules OK (Published by Burn Books 2003)
Boozecan (2004)
East Van (2004)
Langside (2006)
Welfare Wednesdays (2006)
Rock and Roll Heart (2008)
Wrong (2009)
Punch the Boss (2009)
Sins of the Poor (2010)
Up and Down On the Downtown Eastside (2011)
Chase the Dragon (2013)
Richie Dagger: Life & Times (2015)
Liquor & Whores (2016)
North of Hell (2019)
Copz N Robberz (2022)

Biographies
Personality Crisis: Warm Beer and Wild Times (2008)
Argh Fuck Kill: The Story of the DayGlo Abortions (2010)
SNFU: What No One Else Wanted To Say (2012)
Under the Kilt: the Real McKenzies Exposed (2015)
Randy Rampage: I Survived D.O.A. (2016)

Short Stories
Shouts from the Gutter (2007)
Shrieks from the Alley (2012)

Nonfiction
Tales From The Tattoo Shop (2017)

Also published by GFY Press
Destroy Canada by Stewart Black and Chris Walter (2005)
Prisoner of Evil by Simon Snotface (2005)
The Crooked Beat by Drew Gates (2007)

References

External links
GFY Press
Langside Book Review
Dayglo Abortions Book Review
Personality Crisis Book Review
SNFU Book Review
Chase The Dragon Book Review
Montreal Gazette Article on Chris Walter

1959 births
Living people
Canadian male novelists
Writers from Regina, Saskatchewan